Sarvelayat Rural District is a rural district (dehestan) in Sarvelayat District, Nishapur County, Razavi Khorasan province, Iran. At the 2006 census, its population was 10,567, in 2,947 families.  The rural district has 35 villages.

References 

Rural Districts of Razavi Khorasan Province
Nishapur County